Tim  Logush (born September 16, 1952 in Richmond Heights, Missouriho is a retired U.S. soccer forward.  He spent one season in the North American Soccer League and five in the American Soccer League, and earned one cap with the U.S. national team.

High school and college
Logush grew up in a suburb of St. Louis, Missouri and attended Mercy High School, graduating in 1971.  In 1971, he played for St. Louis Kutis S.C., winning the National Amateur Cup with them.  He then entered St. Louis University where he played on the men's soccer team from 1971 to 1974.  The Billikens won the 1972 and 1973 NCAA championships.  He finished his collegiate career with twenty-four goals and twenty-two assists.  He was inducted into the St. Louis Billikens Hall of Fame in 2007.

Professional
The Seattle Sounders of the North American Soccer League (NASL) drafted Logush.  He spent the 1975 season in Seattle, seeing time in only four games.  He then returned to St. Louis where he played for St. Louis Kutis S.C.  In 1977, he signed with the New Jersey Americans of the American Soccer League.

In 1980 he was contracted to play with ASL expansion team the Phoenix Fire, but the team folded in pre-season.

He finished his professional career in 1981 with the Indianapolis Daredevils.

National team
Logush earned one cap with the U.S. national team in a 4–0 loss to Poland on June 24, 1975 when he came on for Randy Garber in the 40th minute.USA - Details of International Matches 1970-1979

Coaching
Following his retirement from playing professionally, Logush became a youth soccer coach in St. Louis.

References

External links
 Seattle Sounders profile
 NASL stats

Living people
1952 births
Sportspeople from St. Louis County, Missouri
Soccer players from Missouri
American soccer players
American Soccer League (1933–1983) players
Indianapolis Daredevils players
New Jersey Americans (ASL) players
North American Soccer League (1968–1984) players
Seattle Sounders (1974–1983) players
Saint Louis Billikens men's soccer players
St. Louis Kutis players
United States men's international soccer players
Association football forwards
Phoenix Fire (soccer) players